Bangle Hill is a mountain located in the Catskill Mountains of New York southeast of Frost Valley. Samson Mountain is located east-northeast and East Mountain is located south of Bangle Hill.

References

Mountains of Ulster County, New York
Mountains of New York (state)